Cucullanus petterae is a species of parasitic nematodes. It is an endoparasite of fish, the Honeycomb grouper Epinephelus merra (Serranidae, Perciformes), which is the type-host, and the Blacktip grouper Epinephelus fasciatus. The species has been described in 2020 by František Moravec & Jean-Lou Justine from material collected off New Caledonia in the South Pacific Ocean.

The name of the species honours Annie Petter, eminent French nematodologist (1932-2017).

References 

Ascaridida
Parasitic nematodes of fish
Nematodes described in 2020
Fauna of New Caledonia
Endoparasites